Veliki Grđevac is a municipality in Bjelovar-Bilogora County, Croatia. According to the 2001 census, there are 3,248 inhabitants, 80.41% of which are Croats, in 1,157 of family households.

Geography 
The present municipality Veliki Grđevac arose during the Croatian War of Independence, separated from the former municipality Grubišno Polje. Municipality area extends from the southwestern slopes of Bilogora hills, across the Česma river towards the northernmost slopes of the Moslavačka gora. Area around the Veliki Grđevac is characterized by wet meadows under Bilogora hills.

Municipality 
The following villages comprise the Veliki Grđevac municipality:
 Cremušina – population 3
 Donja Kovačica – 342
 Dražica – 182
 Gornja Kovačica – 309
 Mala Pisanica – 222
 Mali Grđevac – 13
 Pavlovac – 679
 Sibenik – 38
 Topolovica – 14
 Veliki Grđevac – 1,358
 Zrinska – 153

History
In the late 19th and early 20th century, Veliki Grđevac was part of the Bjelovar-Križevci County of the Kingdom of Croatia-Slavonia.

Notable people 
 Mato Lovrak (1899–1974), Croatian writer
 Károly Knezić (1808–1849), honvéd general in the Hungarian Army
 Dušan Kašić (1914–1990), historian and Orthodox Christian theologian

Monuments and sightseeings 
 Mato Lovrak center — consisting of compositional museum train and a mill with pond that represented the most famous symbols of the Mato Lovrak’s novels: "Train in the Snow" and  "Družba Pere Kvržice" (translated as "Pero Lump gang").
 Friend of Nature Trail — the nature friends path is located nearby Lovrak center, and viewing is accompanied by the guides. The pathis intended for students, for their nature classes, organised groups, and for all friends of nature. Things to see:
 Biology interests of forest vegetations
 The natural regeneration of forest
 Forest animals

Education 
 Osnovna škola Mate Lovraka

Culture 
Lovrak days of culture are traditional cultural and educational events dedicated to the national significance Mato Lovrak, one of the most successful children's writer in Croatia.

Sport 
 Football club "Gordowa" Veliki Grđevac
 Karate Klub "Gordowa" Veliki Grđevac
 Sports-Fishing Association "Grđevica" Veliki Grđevac
 Hunting association "Jelen" (Deer) Veliki Grđevac

References

External links 
  

Municipalities of Croatia
Populated places in Bjelovar-Bilogora County